"Manchild" is a song by Swedish singer-songwriter Neneh Cherry, released as the second single from her debut album, Raw Like Sushi (1989). The single was a top-10 success in the United Kingdom, New Zealand and several European countries. "Manchild" did not chart in the United States or Canada. It was the first song Neneh sat down and wrote. She composed the song on a Casio keyboard (the same one she uses to this day), using an auto-chord setting and ended up with 7 chords in the verse alone. Neneh's stepfather Don Cherry commented on this praisingly, comparing it to a jazz song structure. Nellee Hooper did the beat for the song and wrote the rap with Robert Del Naja. Neneh then gave it to Cameron McVey, who helped to shape the song with the parts and "made it make sense".

The song's lyrics are "directed at a full-grown man who has a little more growing up to do". Neneh expressed the significance of the song for herself, stating it's where she found her sound: "I think "Manchild" was the song where I kind of found my style. I think that song, the style of the song, the spirit and the feeling of the song has reappeared; it always reappears along the way in other songs that I've written; therefore it became the most significant song that I ever wrote, in a way". The music video for "Manchild" was nominated for "Best Video" at the 1990 Brit Awards.

Reception

Critical reception
The Los Angeles Times wrote about the song and its music video, "Nothing less than one of the most visually arresting video clips ever produced, illustrating one of 1989's truly great singles, an accusatory yet compassionate balladic broadside." Mark Lepage from Montreal Gazette felt it "has a graceful sweep". A reviewer from Music & Media described "Manchild" as "slower and more melodic" than "Buffalo Stance", declaring it as "a strong and highly commercial follow-up with a warm production." Jerry Smith from Music Week complimented it as "a simple but highly effective ballad, sure to give her another hit. It's not as immediate but instead has a chorus with a hook that really bites deep after a few plays." Sylvia Patterson from Smash Hits said, "It's nothing like her last single, the stoating "Buffalo Stance", even though there's a few mean rappin' blethers in it but it's the chorus that curdles your windpipe. There's loads of floaty "pshoooo!!" noises and curious keyboard wizardries and it's highly creepy and mesmerising and makes you go all funny in the head."

Retrospective response
In an 2009 review of Raw Like Sushi, Angus Taylor for BBC noted, that the "offbeat, ambient ballad" "Manchild" "showcases Cherry's maternal side". In 2014, Lesley Chow from The Quietus wrote,

Music video
The accompanying music video for "Manchild" was produced by Jean-Baptiste Mondino. It shows Cherry on a virtual beach, while several other people can be seen in the background.  Cherry's daughters, Naima and Tyson, and her step-son, Marlon Roudette, also appear in the video. The camera "slowly rocks back and forth" in line with the beat of the song.

Track listings

 Non-US 7-inch single
A. "Manchild" – 3:52
B. "Manchild" (The Original mix) – 4:44

 12-inch single
A1. "Manchild" (The Old School mix) – 5:32	
B1. "Manchild" (The Original mix) – 4:44
B2. "Buffalo Stance" (The There's Nothing Wrong mix – Sukka Mix II) – 5:36

 European mini-CD and maxi-CD single
 "Manchild" (radio edit)
 "Manchild" (The Old School mix)
 "Buffalo Stance" (The There's Nothing Wrong mix – Sukka Mix II)

 UK 12-inch remix single
A1. "Manchild" (Massive Attack remix) – 5:24
A2. "Manchild" (Massive Attack Bonus Beats) – 0:55
B1. "Manchild" (Smith & Mighty remix) – 4:39
B2. "Manchild" (Smith & Mighty More Bass - Less Vocal Style) – 4:39

 UK cassette single
 "Manchild" (The Old School mix)
 "Buffalo Stance" (The There's Nothing Wrong mix – Sukka Mix II)

 US 7-inch and cassette single
 "Manchild" (edit) – 3:51
 "Phoney Ladies" – 3:53

Charts

Weekly charts

Year-end charts

Sia version

In April 2022, Australian singer Sia released a version as the second single from Cherry's sixth studio album The Versions, released in June of the same year.

References

1989 singles
1989 songs
2022 singles
Music videos directed by Jean-Baptiste Mondino
Neneh Cherry songs
Sia (musician) songs
Song recordings produced by Cameron McVey
Songs written by Cameron McVey
Songs written by Neneh Cherry
Songs written by Robert Del Naja
Virgin Records singles